Luca Saudati (born 18 January 1978 in Milan) is an Italian footballer who played as a winger or as a  second striker.

Football career
Saudati started his career at the A.C. Milan youth system. After relatively unsuccessful loan stints at various clubs - including AC Lugano of the Swiss Super League, Monza of Serie B, Lecco and Como of Serie C1, Empoli of Serie B and Perugia of Serie A - he eventually joined Atalanta of Serie A in June 2001, tagged for 18 billion Italian lire. as part of Massimo Donati and Cristian Zenoni's deal to Milan for 60 billion lire.

However, after scoring no goals in a whole season for Atalanta, he was loaned out again to Empoli of Serie A in the summer of 2002 after poor performance. He broke his leg in November, ruling him out of training and play. When he returned to Atalanta in the summer of 2003, they had dropped to Serie B; despite them being promoted that season, he made just 5 appearances and was loaned once again to Empoli of Serie B in January 2005.

He returned to Atalanta once again in summer 2005, again in Serie B. He scored 3 goals in 12 games before loaned out again to Serie A team U.S. Lecce, to join his former coach Silvio Baldini while at Empoli during the 2002–03 season, but soon Baldini was sacked by the club and Saudati only made 4 appearances in Serie A.

Fortunes changed for Saudati in the summer of 2006. He joined Empoli of Serie A on free transfer in summer 2006, and signed a 3-year contract, where he became team-topscorer of the 2006–07 season with 14 league goals and 4 in the Italian Cup.  Saudati's natural position is left winger but during his time at Empoli enjoyed much success as a second striker.

Saudati was, not surprisingly, voted into the 2006–07 Italian PFA Giocatori Squadra Dell'Anno (Italy's PFA player's team of the season) whilst he also became Empoli's player of the year and received an award for most improved player in the 2006–07 season.

Honours
Empoli
Serie B (1) : 2004–05

Footnotes

External links
 Gazzetta dello Sport profile

1978 births
Living people
Italian footballers
Footballers from Milan
A.C. Milan players
A.C. Monza players
Calcio Lecco 1912 players
Como 1907 players
Empoli F.C. players
A.C. Perugia Calcio players
Atalanta B.C. players
U.S. Lecce players
Spezia Calcio players
Serie A players
Serie B players
Serie C players
Association football forwards
Italian expatriate footballers
Swiss Super League players
FC Lugano players
Italian expatriate sportspeople in Switzerland